Manuel Afonso Correia (born 26 February 1962) is a Portuguese former footballer who played as a central defender, and is a current manager.

Club career
Born in Seixal, Setúbal District, Correia appeared in 299 Primeira Liga matches over nine seasons, scoring a total of nine goals for F.C. Vizela and G.D. Chaves and also representing F.C. Penafiel. He made his debut in the competition on 26 August 1984 whilst at the service of the first club, in a 1–2 home loss against S.L. Benfica.

Correia retired at the end of the 1995–96 campaign at the age of 34, after helping Chaves retain their top-division status. He subsequently worked as a manager, being in charge of several teams in the Segunda Liga.

Personal life
Correia's son, Rui, was also a footballer and a defender.

References

External links

1962 births
Living people
People from Seixal
Portuguese footballers
Association football defenders
Primeira Liga players
Liga Portugal 2 players
Seixal F.C. players
G.D. Sesimbra footballers
O Elvas C.A.D. players
F.C. Vizela players
F.C. Penafiel players
G.D. Chaves players
Portuguese football managers
Primeira Liga managers
Liga Portugal 2 managers
G.D. Chaves managers
F.C. Penafiel managers
C.D. Aves managers
Sportspeople from Setúbal District